Kingin' with Tyga is an American reality television series that premiered on July 24, 2015, on MTV2. The show was announced on April 14, 2015. The six episode, half-hour series follows the life of rapper Tyga as he works on his music career and chronicles his luxurious lifestyle. The show returned with a second season which premiered August 4, 2016 on MTV.

Episodes

Series overview

Season 1 (2015)

Season 2 (2016)

References

External links 

 
 
 

2010s American reality television series
2015 American television series debuts
2016 American television series endings
English-language television shows
MTV original programming
Television shows set in Los Angeles
African-American reality television series
Television series based on singers and musicians
Tyga